The Cambridge History of Turkey is a four-volume series on the history of the Ottoman Empire and Republic of Turkey.

The fourth volume was criticized for almost omitting the Armenian genocide, which it did not classify as a genocide, and never mentioning the Assyrian genocide or Greek genocide.

References

History books about Turkey
Cambridge University Press books
Cambridge